Daiane Limeira Santos Silva (born 7 September 1997), commonly known as Daiane Limeira or simply Daiane, is a Brazilian professional footballer who plays as a defender for Flamengo and the Brazil women's national team.

Club career
Daiane began her formal football training at Clube de Regatas do Flamengo's soccer school in Uberlândia. At 16 years old she had a successful trial with Associação Desportiva Centro Olímpico, but was unable to raise enough funds to relocate to São Paulo and take up her place. Instead she tried out with Kindermann's under-17 team, where she impressed enough to be brought straight into the adult first team.

During 2014 Daiane played futsal for Associação Desportiva 3R's under-17 team and for Joinville at the Joguinhos Abertos de Santa Catarina. In 2015 she played football for both XV de Piracicaba and Tiradentes, before spending 2016 with Rio Preto. At XV de Piracicaba she was switched from playing on the wing to central defence. She proved a revelation in her new position and was soon attracting notice from scouts. In her season at Rio Preto the team won the Campeonato Paulista and were runners-up in the Campeonato Brasileiro.

She agreed a transfer to Norwegian Toppserien club Avaldsnes for their 2017 season, which culminated in them winning the Norwegian Women's Cup for the first time. In August 2018, Paris Saint-Germain of the Division 1 Féminine signed Daiane to a three-year contract. In August 2019, Daiane joined CD Tacón in the Primera División. Tacón became Real Madrid in 2020–21, but Daiane's career was interrupted by three knee surgeries. She joined Madrid CFF for 2021–22. In June 2022 she returned to Brazilian football with Flamengo.

International career
Daiane was called up in the Brazil u20 selection for its debut in August 2015. She played well at the 2016 FIFA U-20 Women's World Cup in Papua New Guinea, being named player of the match in Brazil's 1–1 draw with Sweden.

In January 2018, national team coach Vadão included Daiane in her debut in the Brazil women's national football team. She made her international debut on 13 March 2018 for the 2018 Copa América Femenina defeating Bolivia, 7–0.

. Brazil remained undefeated and won the tournament, securing qualification for the 2019 FIFA Women's World Cup in France. Daiane retained her place in the squad for the 2018 Tournament of Nations in July and August 2018.

Daiane was not included in Brazil's initial squad for the 2019 FIFA Women's World Cup, but was a late call-up when Érika withdrew with a calf injury.

Personal life
Daiane is from a large family, variously reported as being among 18 or 23 siblings. When she turned professional she began sending money to her family in Uberlândia, explaining that her priority was helping her parents to buy their own house.

References

External links
 
 Profile at Paris Saint-Germain
 N3 Sports agency profile 

1997 births
Living people
Brazilian women's footballers
Brazil women's international footballers
Sportspeople from Londrina
Women's association football forwards
Paris Saint-Germain Féminine players
Brazilian expatriate women's footballers
Expatriate women's footballers in France
Brazilian expatriate sportspeople in France
Division 1 Féminine players
Brazilian expatriate sportspeople in Norway
Expatriate women's footballers in Norway
Toppserien players
Avaldsnes IL players
2019 FIFA Women's World Cup players
Real Madrid Femenino players
Primera División (women) players
Brazilian expatriate sportspeople in Spain
Expatriate women's footballers in Spain
Sociedade Esportiva Kindermann players
Madrid CFF players
Clube de Regatas do Flamengo (women) players